Berende Cove is the 3.3 km wide cove indenting for 1.15 km the southwest coast of Greenwich Island in the South Shetland Islands, Antarctica.  Entered south of Pelishat Point.

The cove is named after the settlements of Berende in western Bulgaria.

Location
Bulgarian mapping in 2009.

Map
 L.L. Ivanov. Antarctica: Livingston Island and Greenwich, Robert, Snow and Smith Islands. Scale 1:120000 topographic map.  Troyan: Manfred Wörner Foundation, 2009.

References
 Bulgarian Antarctic Gazetteer. Antarctic Place-names Commission. (details in Bulgarian, basic data in English)
 Berende Cove. SCAR Composite Antarctic Gazetteer

External links
 Berende Cove. Copernix satellite image

Coves of Greenwich Island
Bulgaria and the Antarctic